Tirana Bank is a bank based in Tirana, Albania. The bank was founded in September 1996 and was the first privately owned bank in Albania. The bank was a subsidiary of Piraeus Bank until August 2018 when it was announced the agreement on the sale of Tirana Bank to Balfin Group and Komercijalna Banka.

References

External links

Official site

Buildings and structures in Tirana
Banks of Albania